The Coppa Italia (Italian Cup), from 2011 until 2018 Excellence Trophy, is a rugby union competition in Italy for domestic clubs. The competition is second to the Top12, the Italian national championship. The competition has been contested annually since 1967, though it was not held from 1974 to 1980, and 1983 to 1994, and again in 1996, 1999 and 2002. The first club to win the competition was CUS Roma.

From 2011 to 2020, it involves only teams from the Top12 who don't participate to the European Rugby Challenge Cup Qualifying Competition, now Continental Shield.

Past winners

Performance by club
{| class="wikitable"
|-
! Club
! Winners
! Winning Years
|-
| Viadana
| 6
| 2000, 2003, 2007, 2013, 2016, 2017
|-
| Fiamme Oro
| 5
| 1968, 1969, 1971, 1972, 2014
|-
| Benetton Treviso
| 4
| 1970, 1998, 2005, 2010
|-
| Calvisano
| 3
| 2004, 2012, 2015
|-
| Parma
| 3
| 2006, 2008, 2009
|-
| Petrarca
| 3
| 1982, 2001, 2022
|-
| Rugby Roma Olimpic
| 2
| 1999, 2011
|-
| L'Aquila
| 2
| 1973, 1981
|-
| Rovigo Delta
| 1
| 2020
|-
| Valorugby Emilia
| 1
| 2019
|-
| San Donà
| 1
| 2018
|-
| Milan
| 1
| 1995
|-
| CUS Roma
| 1
| 1967
|}

See also
Rugby union in Italy
Top12

External links
 Official site FIR

Rugby union competitions in Italy
1967 establishments in Italy